Kalammawadi Dam, is a gravity dam on Dudhaganga river near Radhanagari in the State of Maharashtra, India. Kalammawadi dam is the biggest dam in Kolhapur District. The dam construction was initiated by the Government of Maharashtra in 1983 and was completed in 1999. It is being used for irrigation as well as hydro-electricity power generator. There are great locations for outings, listed on Kolhapur Tourism

The dam was built on Dudhaganga river, which is located in the south western part of Kolhapur district in Maharashtra, it was inaugurated by Indira Gandhi, the late prime minister of India. With a water storage capacity of 28 Thousand Million Cubic(TMC), the dam is located amidst a scenic surrounding with the backdrop of a thick forest cover. The surrounding dense forest has a large biodiversity. It is also home to India's endangered bison which is called the Gaur. The dam is situated at village Kalammawadi (Dudhaganga Nagar). It has left and right canals connected to carry water for irrigation purposes. The hydroelectric power generation house has three electric generators in good working conditions beneath the dam. There are many villages on bank of Dudhganga river which uses the dam water for domestic purposes. There is a temple of the goddess Kalamma Devi.

Specifications

Purpose
 Irrigation 
 Hydroelectricity

See also
 List of reservoirs and dams in India

References

Dams in Kolhapur district
1973 establishments in Maharashtra
Dams completed in 1973